The Arlington Expressway, which carries the unsigned State Road 10A (SR 10A) and mostly also the signed State Road 115 in Jacksonville, Florida, is a freeway that heads east from Downtown Jacksonville over the Mathews Bridge to Atlantic Boulevard (State Road 10) at the Regency Square Mall.

Route description
SR 10A begins downtown overlapping SR 139 on a one-way pair at Main Street (US 1 / US 17), with eastbound SR 10A following Union Street and westbound following State Street. At the intersection with North Liberty Street, SR 10A leaves city streets and enters the Arlington Expressway, which includes sidewalks west of the Mathews Bridge, a rarity on freeways. The first interchange is with A. Philip Randolph Boulevard for the Sports Complex, followed by a junction with the Martin Luther King Jr. Parkway, where SR 139 ends and SR 115 joins the expressway to cross the Mathews Bridge over the St. Johns River. This bridge also runs over the Exchange Club Park island. After crossing the bridge, the first interchange is with State Road 109 north followed by another with SR 109 south. Two other interchanges exists with Arlington Road and then with local businesses along the service roads. Just after the interchange with northbound State Road 113 (Southside Connector), State Road 115 (Southside Boulevard) turns south, while SR 10A continues east to terminate at State Road 10.

Exit list

References

Expressways in Duval County, Florida
Arlington, Jacksonville